Michael John Nunn (born April 14, 1963) is an American former professional boxer who competed from 1984 to 2002. He is a two-weight world champion, having held the IBF middleweight title from 1988 to 1991, and the WBA super middleweight title from 1992 to 1994. During both those reigns, he also held the lineal championship. In 2004, Nunn was sentenced to 24 years in prison for drug trafficking; he was released in February 2019.

Amateur career
Nunn won three Iowa Golden Gloves titles and posted an amateur record of 168-8. At the 1984 Olympic trials, U.S. boxing officials asked Nunn, who was boxing as a 156-pounder, to move up to the 165-pound division. They wanted to clear the way for Frank Tate, the eventual Olympic gold medalist, who was being heralded as America's next great middleweight. Tate's last loss was to Nunn.

After agreeing to move up in weight, Nunn boxed Virgil Hill at the Olympic trials in Fort Worth, Texas. Hill defeated Nunn by a 4-1 decision. Nunn and Hill boxed again at the Olympic box-offs in Las Vegas, Nevada. Nunn won the first box-off by a 5-0 decision. In the second box-off, Hill dropped Nunn and won by a 5-0 decision to make the Olympic team as the U.S. representative in the 165-pound division.

Professional career

Middleweight
Nunn turned professional in 1984. After winning his first thirty fights, he fought IBF middleweight title-holder Frank Tate, who was 23-0. The fight took place on July 28, 1988 at Caesar's Palace in Las Vegas. Nunn won the title by a ninth-round knockout.

In his first title defense, he knocked out Juan Roldan in the eighth round. His second defense was a stunning first-round knockout of Sumbu Kalambay to capture the vacant lineal middleweight championship. Nunn's next two title defenses were twelve-round majority decision wins over Iran Barkley and Marlon Starling. For his fifth defense, Nunn went to France and knocked out Donald Curry in ten rounds. On May 10, 1991, in his hometown of Davenport, Iowa, Nunn lost his title in a big upset to James Toney. Nunn, well ahead on points after ten rounds, was knocked out after being dropped by a left hook in the eleventh round.

Super middleweight
After the loss, Nunn moved up a weight division to super middleweight and won the NABF title with a tenth-round stoppage against Randall Yonker. On September 12, 1992, Nunn won the WBA and lineal super middleweight titles with a controversial twelve-round split decision over Victor Cordoba. The WBA ordered a rematch, which took place on January 30, 1993. Nunn fought much better in the rematch, winning by a one-sided twelve-round unanimous decision.

In his fifth title defense, Nunn lost the title to Steve Little by a twelve-round split decision on February 26, 1994, in another huge upset. On December 17, 1994, Nunn traveled to Ecuador to fight Frankie Liles in an attempt to regain the lineal and WBA super middleweight titles. In a very close fight, Liles, who had defeated Little in his previous fight to win the title, defeated Nunn by a twelve-round unanimous decision.

Light heavyweight
After nine consecutive wins, Nunn got another title shot. On March 21, 1998, he fought Graciano Rocchigiani for the vacant WBC light heavyweight title in Germany. Nunn lost by a twelve-round split decision, with the judges favouring Rocchigiani's fewer, more solid punches over Nunn's much higher volume of lighter shots.

On January 23, 2002, Nunn defeated Vinson Durhan by a ten-round unanimous decision at Caesars Indiana in Bridgeport, Indiana. It would be his last fight. He finished with a record of 58-4 with 37 knockouts.

Arrest and sentencing
On August 6, 2002, at a hotel in his hometown of Davenport, Iowa, Nunn was arrested after paying an undercover agent $200 for one kilogram of cocaine, which had a street value of $24,000. In May 2003, he pleaded guilty to one count of conspiracy to distribute cocaine. The following January, Nunn was sentenced to 292 months in federal prison by U.S. District Judge William Gritzer, who agreed to a higher sentencing guideline after considering Nunn's long history of drug trafficking and the likelihood that he used a firearm during drug deals.

During the three-day sentencing hearing, prosecutors called witnesses who testified about Nunn's drug activity dating back to 1993. Nunn, who accepted responsibility for buying drugs in August 2002, denied his involvement in drug trafficking. He pointed out that several of the witnesses were in prison and could have their sentences reduced for providing testimony.

Nunn, who was defiant throughout the hearing, accused government lawyers of lying and scheming against him. "You guys haven't shown me nothing," Nunn said in his statement to the judge. "Where are your facts, Mr. Prosecutor?"

Nunn was released from federal prison on August 8, 2019.

Professional boxing record

Personal
Nunn's brother in law is Roger Craig, a professional American football player who married Nunn's sister.

See also
List of middleweight boxing champions
List of super middleweight boxing champions
List of WBA world champions
List of IBF world champions

References

External links

1963 births
Living people
Sportspeople from Davenport, Iowa
World Boxing Association champions
International Boxing Federation champions
Boxers from Iowa
American male boxers
Light-heavyweight boxers
Southpaw boxers
World middleweight boxing champions
World super-middleweight boxing champions
American drug traffickers
American sportspeople convicted of crimes